This is a list of Artists Music Guild Heritage award winners.

AMG Heritage Award recipients and nominees
The Artists Music Guild produces an awards show every year to acknowledge all forms of artistry. The Guild currently has twenty-five categories in which artists may vie for the prestigious Heritage Award. The AMG's are held on the second weekend of November and were held at the historic Heritage USA, former home of the PTL Club and Jim Bakker and his wife Tammy Faye Bakker. After the loss of the studios the AMG's were then moved to Monroe, NC and sponsored by the city. They are currently taking place at the AG Convention Center in Monroe.

Lifetime achievement awards

Special recognition awards
2012

 THE GOSPEL HARMONY BOYS in recognition to their sixty years in the industry.
 BRYAN WRIGHT in recognition of excellence service to the Guild

2013

 Jack Stone in recognition of excellence service to the Guild
 Joan Whitaker in recognition of excellence service to the Guild

2014

 Hearts of Faith in recognition of excellence service to the Guild
 Jeff Steinberg in recognition of excellence service to the Guild

2015
 Gene Snow in recognition of excellence service to the Guild
 Morning Sun Yellow Pony in recognition of excellence service to the Guild
 Matthew Dudney & Christy Sutherland in recognition of excellence service to the Guild
 Tammy Webster in recognition of excellence service to the Guild
 Donna Ritchie in recognition of excellence service to the Guild

2016

 Pete Hovanec in recognition of excellence service to the Guild
 Connie Ross in recognition of excellence service to the Guild
 Bonita Simpson in recognition of excellence service to the Guild
 Mayor Michael Alvarez in recognition of excellence service to the Guild
 Debbie Bennett in recognition of excellence service to the Guild

2017

 Nils Bundy in recognition of excellence service to the Guild
 Eric Pearson in recognition of excellence service to the Guild
 Cathy Reese in recognition of excellence service to the Guild

References

American television awards